Eupithecia orsetilla is a moth in the family Geometridae first described by Herbert Druce in 1893. It is found in Mexico, Guatemala and Costa Rica.

The forewings are dark silky brown, crossed by several very indistinct pale brown waved lines, and with a very narrow submarginal waved line extending from the apex to the anal angle and a black dot at the end of the cell. The hindwings are a little lighter than the forewings, mottled with pale brown near the anal angle.

References

Moths described in 1893
orsetilla
Moths of North America